Yunnan frog may refer to:

 Yunnan Asian frog (Nanorana unculuanus), a frog endemic to Yunnan, China
 Yunnan odorous frog (Odorrana andersonii ), a frog found in India, Myanmar, China, Thailand, Laos, and Vietnam
 Yunnan paa frog (Nanorana yunnanensis), a frog found in China, Vietnam, Myanmar, and possibly Laos
 Yunnan pond frog (Babina pleuraden), a frog found in China and possibly Myanmar

Animal common name disambiguation pages